The Visitors' List and Guide was a weekly English language newspaper, distributed around settlements on the mid West Wales coast such as Aberystwyth, Borth, Aberdyfi, Tywyn and Aberaeron. It contained local news and information and a list of visitors.

References

Newspapers published in Wales